Siegrun Siegl ( Thon, born 29 October 1954 in Apolda, Thuringia) is a retired East German athlete who specialised in the pentathlon and later long jump.

Biography
She finished fourth in pentathlon at the 1974 European Championships. On 19 May 1976 she broke the world record in long jump with 6.99 metres in Dresden, only 10 days after her fellow East German, Angela Voigt, had set a new record. 

 She only finished fourth in this event at the 1976 Montreal Olympics, but won the gold medal in pentathlon.

After this she concentrated on the long jump only. She won the 1979 European Indoor Championships and finished fifth at the 1980 Summer Olympics. However, 6.99 m remained her career best jump, and today this places her seventh on the German all-time performers list, behind Heike Drechsler, Helga Radtke, Sabine Paetz, Brigitte Wujak, Birgit Großhennig and Susen Tiedtke.

She competed for the sports club SC Turbine Erfurt during her active career.

References

External links
 
 

1954 births
Living people
People from Apolda
East German female long jumpers
East German pentathletes
Athletes (track and field) at the 1976 Summer Olympics
Athletes (track and field) at the 1980 Summer Olympics
Olympic athletes of East Germany
World record setters in athletics (track and field)
Sportspeople from Thuringia
Medalists at the 1976 Summer Olympics
Olympic gold medalists for East Germany
Olympic gold medalists in athletics (track and field)
People from Bezirk Erfurt